Edward I of England (1239–1307) was King of England from 1272 to 1307.

Edward I may also refer to:
Edward I, Count of Bar (died 1336), grandson and namesake of Edward I of England, Count of Bar from 1302 to 1336
Edward of Portugal (1391–1438), King of Portugal and the Algarve
Edward I (Moskito), king of the Miskito from about 1739 until 1755
Edward Balliol (c. 1283–1367), disputed King of Scotland in the 14th century
Edward Bruce (c. 1280–1318), disputed King of Ireland in the 14th century

See also
Edward the Elder, first King Edward of Anglo-Saxon England
King Edward (disambiguation)